Jéssica Da Silva Quintino (born 17 April 1991, São Paulo) is a Brazilian handball player for Odense Håndbold and the Brazilian national team.

She participated at the 2011 World Women's Handball Championship in Brazil. She participated at the 2012 Summer Olympics in London, where the Brazilian team placed sixth, and the 2016 Summer Olympics, where the Brazilian team were fifth.

Achievements

National team
Pan American Games:
Winner: 2011, 2015
Pan American Championship:
Winner: 2011, 2013, 2015, 2017

Domestic competitions
Danish Championship:
Winner: 2021
Silver Medalist: 2018, 2020
Bronze Medalist: 2019
Danish Cup:
Winner: 2020
Finalist: 2018, 2019

Awards and recognition
All-Star Right Wing of the Pan American Championship: 2017
All-Star Right Wimg of the 2021 South and Central American Women's Handball Championship

References

External links

1991 births
Living people
Handball players from São Paulo
Brazilian female handball players
Handball players at the 2011 Pan American Games
Handball players at the 2015 Pan American Games
Handball players at the 2012 Summer Olympics
Handball players at the 2016 Summer Olympics
Expatriate handball players in Poland
Brazilian expatriate sportspeople in Denmark
Brazilian expatriates in Poland
Olympic handball players of Brazil
Pan American Games gold medalists for Brazil
Pan American Games medalists in handball
South American Games gold medalists for Brazil
South American Games medalists in handball
Competitors at the 2018 South American Games
Medalists at the 2015 Pan American Games
Medalists at the 2011 Pan American Games
20th-century Brazilian women
21st-century Brazilian women